David Wyndham James Brown (26 February 1942 – 17 August 2021) was an English cricketer. He played for Gloucestershire between 1964 and 1967.

Brown was a middle-order batsman. On his first-class debut in 1964 he top-scored with a solid 50 in Gloucestershire's first innings of 139 against Surrey. He made his only first-class century against Glamorgan in 1965 when he scored 142 to avert defeat after Gloucestershire had followed on. He was Gloucestershire's top scorer with 59 in the first innings of the low-scoring match against Pakistan in 1967.

References

External links

1942 births
2021 deaths
English cricketers
Gloucestershire cricketers
Sportspeople from Cheltenham